The Leyland railmotor (also known at the double-ended railmotor) was introduced by the Victorian Railways in 1925. After the success of the AEC railmotor, the Victorian Railways wanted a more powerful and comfortable vehicle, for longer journeys.

Two similar railmotors were constructed for the Tasmanian Government Railways in 1925.

History
Four of the railmotors were built by the Victorian Railways for use in Victoria, mostly on the services to Echuca, Cohuna, Whittlesea and Tallangatta, with the occasional trip to Mansfield and Maffra. They were also used on some mainline services.

The Leyland railmotors remained in service until the last two were withdrawn in July 1954, following the introduction of the Walker railmotors.

Preservation
53RM is preserved at the Daylesford Spa Country Railway. It is planned to return it to service when time and funds permit. The vehicle had been taken off-register on 30 July 1954 in lieu of 52RM, which experienced a crack in the drive bogie at Picola.

References

Victorian Railways railmotors
Leyland vehicles